Chesbro Reservoir is an artificial lake located three miles (5 km) west of Morgan Hill, California, in the United States.  A  county park surrounds the reservoir and provides limited fishing ("catch-and-release"), picnicking, and hiking activities.  Swimming and boating are not permitted in the reservoir.

History
The reservoir and dam were named after Elmer J. Chesbro, a local doctor who was president of the Santa Clara Valley Water Conservation District (now the Santa Clara Valley Water District) at the time.

See also 
List of dams and reservoirs in California
List of lakes in California
List of lakes in the San Francisco Bay Area

References

External links 
Santa Clara County Parks (includes directions and history)

Reservoirs in Santa Clara County, California
Reservoirs in California
Reservoirs in Northern California